The 1998-99 Azerbaijan Top League was the eighth season of the Azerbaijan Top League, since their independence from the USSR in August 1991, and was contested by 14 clubs. The season took place between 15 August 1998 and May 1999 and was won by Kapaz with Neftqaz Bakı and Shahdag being relegated to the Azerbaijan First Division as well as Bakili Baku due to financial problems.

Teams

Stadia and locations

1Qarabağ played their home matches at Surakhani Stadium in Baku before moving to their current stadium on 3 May 2009.

First round

League table

Results

Second round

Championship group

Table

Results

7-10 group

Table

Results

Relegation group

Table

Results

Season statistics

Top scorers

References

External links
Azerbaijan 1998-99 RSSSF
APL Stats

Azerbaijan Premier League seasons
Azer
1998–99 in Azerbaijani football